The 2008 Associates Tri-Series in Canada was a One Day International cricket tournament held in Canada. The tri-series involved the national teams of Bermuda, Canada and West Indies.

Group stage

Points Table

Matches

Final

International cricket competitions in 2008
One Day International cricket competitions
Ass
Associates Tr